The Coma Supercluster (SCl 117) is a nearby supercluster of galaxies comprising the Coma Cluster (Abell 1656) and the Leo Cluster (Abell 1367).

Located 300 million light-years from Earth, it is in the center of the Great Wall and a part of the Coma Filament. The Coma Supercluster is the nearest massive cluster of galaxies to our own Virgo Supercluster.

It is roughly spherical, about 20 million light-years in diameter and contains more than 3,000 galaxies. It is located in the constellation Coma Berenices. Being one of the first superclusters to be discovered, the Coma Supercluster helped astronomers understand the large scale structure of the universe.

See also
 Abell catalogue
 Large-scale structure of the universe
 List of Abell clusters

References

 
Coma Berenices
Leo (constellation)
Great Wall filament
Galaxy superclusters